Old Stonington is an unincorporated community in Christian County, Illinois, United States.

References

Unincorporated communities in Christian County, Illinois
Unincorporated communities in Illinois